Gábor Polényi (born 2 July 1991) is a Hungarian football player who plays for Siófok.

References

External links
Gábor Polényi

1991 births
Living people
Sportspeople from Miskolc
Hungarian footballers
Association football defenders
Diósgyőri VTK players
Vasas SC players
Putnok VSE footballers
Nyíregyháza Spartacus FC players
BFC Siófok players
Mezőkövesdi SE footballers
Zalaegerszegi TE players
Békéscsaba 1912 Előre footballers
Nemzeti Bajnokság I players
Nemzeti Bajnokság II players